The 2003 Asian Weightlifting Championships were held in Qinhuangdao, China between September 10 and September 14, 2003. It was the 35th men's and 16th women's championship. The event was organised by the Asian Weightlifting Federation.

Medal summary

Men

Women

Medal table 

Ranking by Big (Total result) medals 

Ranking by all medals: Big (Total result) and Small (Snatch and Clean & Jerk)

Participating nations 
91 athletes from 14 nations competed.

 (1)
 (15)
 (4)
 (9)
 (12)
 (8)
 (3)
 (8)
 (3)
 (4)
 (4)
 (7)
 (6)
 (7)

References
Men's Results
Women's Results

Asian Weightlifting Championships
Asian Weightlifting Championships
Weightlifting Championships
Asian Weightlifting Championships